Christoph Krauss (born 1964 in Hof/Saale, Germany) is a freelance cinematographer and director of photography for fictional movie and TV-productions, documentaries and art projects (film and video-installations).

Life 
Christoph Krauss learnt the craft of cinematography at Berlin's Technical College for Optics and Photo-Technics (SFOF) and started his professional career as a lighting technician. Then, he went on to become an assistant cameraman and camera operator later. Since 1995, he has had responsibility for cinematography on numerous productions in Germany and abroad. His filmography includes feature films, TV-series and documentaries as well as underwater photography, action film shoots and art projects.
In 1993, he helped set up the developmental video project "Theatre for Development" at the Bricks Township Center in Windhoek, Namibia. Later, he also taught at the Faculty of Media Design/Media Art at the Bauhaus University Weimar  as part of a lectureship in 2010.
Christoph Krauss lives in Berlin and belongs to the German Society of Cinematographers, (BVK).
He is a member of the German Film Academy as well as the European Film Academy and is represented by the agency "Players".
With Manifesto he won the German Cinematography Award 2017 (Deutscher Kamerapreis 2017) in the category feature film and a nomination for the German Film Awards 2018 / Best Cinematography.

Co-operation 
Christoph Krauss has co-operated with the following directors (in alphabetical order):

Christian Alvart, Angeliki Antoniou, Kevin Bachar, Walter Bannert, Axel Barth, bauhouse, Jürgen Bretzinger, Roland Busch, Sibylle Dahrendorf, Nicole-Nadine Deppé, Simone Dobmeier, Matl Findel, Herwig Fischer, Gunter Friedrich, Holger Gimpel, Esther Gronenborn, Nana Grote, Tsui Hark, Raoul W. Heimrich, Oliver Hirschbiegel, Hermann Joha, Heidi Kranz, Torsten Künstler, Sylvie Lazzarini, Nicos Ligouris, Mathias Luther, M+M, Yingli Ma, Wojciech Marczewski, Uli Möller, Claudia Müller, Till Müller-Edenborn, Michael Muschner, Marc Ottiker, Stefan Richter, Julian Rosefeldt, Sigi Rothemund, Christoph Rüter, Christoph Schnee, José van der Schoot, Wolfram Seipp, Monty Simons, Torsten Striegnitz, Charly Weller, Rolf Wellingerhof, Eric Will, Donnie Yen, Chen Yifei, Tom Zenker

Projects 
Fictional projects (selection):
 Das weiße Schweigen (feature film, 2021), director: Esther Gronenborn, production: Nordfilm / TV NOW
 Matze, Kebab und Sauerkraut (feature film, 2020), director: Christoph Schnee, production: CCC Cinema and Television  / ZDF
 Die Heiland - Wir sind Anwalt (TV-serial, 6 episodes, 2020-2021), director: Christoph Schnee, production: Olga Film / ARD
 Der faule Engel (TV-movie, 2019), director: Christoph Schnee, production: Neue Schönhauser Filmproduktion / ZDF
 Dogs of Berlin (Netflix-serial, episodes 05-10, 2018), director: Christian Alvart, production: Syrreal Dogs / Netflix
 Steig. Nicht. Aus! (feature film, 2017), director: Christian Alvart, production: Syrreal Entertainment / Traumfabrik Babelsberg
 Manifesto (linear version of the film-installation with Cate Blanchett performing 13 characters, 2015/16, 94 min.), director: Julian Rosefeldt, production: Schiwago Film Berlin
 Die Rosenheim-Cops (TV-serial, 44 episodes, 2008–2017), directors: Walter Bannert, Herwig Fischer, Holger Gimpel, Tom Zenker, production: Bavaria Film / ZDF
 Hubert und Staller (TV-serial, 3 episodes, 2016), director: Holger Gimpel, production: Entertainment Factory / ARD
 Die Garmisch-Cops (TV-serial, 16 episodes, 2012–2013), directors: Walter Bannert, Holger Gimpel, production: Bavaria Film / ZDF
 Schloss Einstein (Kids-serial, 12 episodes, 2010-2011), director: Till Müller-Edenborn, production: Saxonia Media / KiKa
 Weißblaue Geschichten (TV-serial, 10 episodes, 2014 and 2010), directors: Walter Bannert, Gunter Friedrich, production: Bavaria Film / ZDF
 Tierärztin Dr. Mertens (TV-serial, 17 episodes, 2005–2009), directors: Mathias Luther, Heidi Kranz, production: Saxonia Media / ARD
 Die Kommissarin (TV-serial, 3 episodes, 2005), director: Charly Weller, production: Odeon TV / ARD
 Ein Fall für Zwei (TV-serial, 2 episodes, 2005–2006), director: Charly Weller, production: Odeon TV / ZDF
 Im Namen des Gesetzes (TV-serial, 25 episodes, 2001–2006), directors: Holger Gimpel, Mathias Luther, Charly Weller, Uli Möller, Axel Barth, Rolf Wellingerhof, production: Opal Film / RTL
 KRIMI.DE (TV-serial, 2 episodes, 2006), director: Mathias Luther, production: Kinderfilm / MDR / Kika
 Alarm für Cobra 11 (TV-serial, 7 episodes, 2001–2004), directors: Axel Barth, Raoul W. Heimrich, Holger Gimpel, production: Action Concept / RTL
 Alarm für Cobra 11 – Einsatz für Team 2 (TV-serial, 2 episodes, 2003), director: Sigi Rothemund, production: Action Concept / RTL
 "Tsui Hark - E.F.A. Master Class 2001" (cinematography for the action-workshop under the direction of Tsui Hark), production: European Film Academy
  (TV-serial, 2 episodes, 2000), director: Jürgen Bretzinger, Donnie Yen, production: Nostro Film / RTL
 "Ways of seeing actors - directing actors" (cinematography for the directors-workshop under the instruction of Wojciech Marczewski, 1999/2000), production: Master School Drehbuch / Focal
 Alle Zeit der Welt (feature film, 1997), director: Matl Findel, production: Schramm Film / ZDF
 Days of Miandi (feature film, China / Germany 1996), director: Yingli Ma, production: DFFB Berlin / Wanhai Co. Beijing

Documentary projects (selection):
 Sing! (partially, D 2020-2021), director: Torsten Striegnitz and Simone Dobmeier, production: Gebrüder Beetz / Arte
 Fetisch Karl Marx (2018, 52 min.), director: Torsten Striegnitz and Simone Dobmeier, production: Medea Film / Arte
 Künstlerinnen - Katharina Grosse (2016, 45 min.), director: Claudia Müller, production: Phlox Film / Arte
 Knistern der Zeit (partially, Burkina Faso / Germany 2010-11, 106 min.), director: Sibylle Dahrendorf, production: Perfect Shot Films Berlin / ZDF / 3 Sat
 Klaus Kinski, Ich bin kein Schauspieler (2000, 45 min.), director: Christoph Rüter, production: Zero Film / WDR / Arte
 Mummies: Frozen in Time (German part, Germany / USA 1999, 52 min.), director: Kevin Bachar, production: Pangolin Pictures N.Y. / Learning Channel
 Nun geht die Nacht zu Ende (Kinomagazin: Max Färberböck, 1999), director: Nicos Ligouris, production: 3 Sat / WDR
 Escape to Shanghai (German part, Germany / USA / China 2000, 70 min.), director: Chen Yifei, production: Shanghai Yifei Culture Film
 Byebye - Hello (Germany / Hong Kong 1997, 65 min.), director: Yingli Ma, production: Hartmut Jahn Film / ZDF
 Feuerfluss (Germany / Croatia / Serbia / Bosnia-Herzegowina 1997, 50 min.), director: Sibylle Dahrendorf, production: Sibylle Dahrendorf Film
 Tänze der Nacht (German part, Germany / Egypt 1996, 60 min.), director: Angeliki Antoniou, production: Jost Hering Filmproduktion / SFB / 3 Sat
 Onder Broeders - Unter Brüdern (Germany / Netherlands 1996, 15 min.), director: José van der Schoot, production: Jost Hering Filmproduktion / Arte
 Der gute Mensch  (1990, 60 min.), director: Wolfram Seipp, production: Seipp Filmproduktion / HFF Munich

Art projects (selection):
 Manifesto (13-channel-installation with Cate Blanchett performing 13 characters, 2015, 12x 10 min.), director: Julian Rosefeldt, production: Schiwago Film Berlin
 "The creation / In the Land of Drought" (single-screen-installation, 2015, 45 min.), director: Julian Rosefeldt, production: Julian Rosefeldt Filmproduktion / Ruhrtriennale
 Deep Gold (single-screen-installation, 2013–14, 18 min., b/w), part of the cadavre exquis Der Stachel des Skorpions, director: Julian Rosefeldt, production: Julian Rosefeldt Filmproduktion
 My home is a dark and cloud-hung land (4-channel-installation, 2011, 39 min.), director: Julian Rosefeldt, production: Julian Rosefeldt Filmproduktion
 American Night (5-channel-installation, Germany / Spain 2009, 42 min.), director: Julian Rosefeldt, production: Julian Rosefeldt Filmproduktion
 European Film Award (3-channel-live-Installation, 2009), director: bauhouse, production: European Film Academy
 The Shift (4-Channel-Installation, 2008, 22 min.), director: Julian Rosefeldt, production: Julian Rosefeldt Filmproduktion / Schaubühne Berlin
 Milk! (single-screen-installation, Germany / France 2007, 39 min.), director: Julian Rosefeldt, production: Julian Rosefeldt Filmproduktion / Temps d'Image / Arte
 Ship of Fools (4-channel-installation, 2007, 20 min.), director: Julian Rosefeldt, production: Julian Rosefeldt Filmproduktion / Arndt + Partner
 Lonely Planet (1-channel-installation, Germany / India 2006, 16 min.), director: Julian Rosefeldt, production: Julian Rosefeldt Filmproduktion / Goethe Institut
 Trilogy of failure, The Perfectionist (3-channel-installation, 2005, 25 min.), director: Julian Rosefeldt, production: Julian Rosefeldt Filmproduktion / Arndt + Partner
 Trilogy of failure, Stunned Man (2-channel-installation, 2004, 25 min.), director: Julian Rosefeldt, production: Julian Rosefeldt Filmproduktion / Arndt + Partner
 Trilogy of failure, Soundmaker (3-channel-installation, 2004, 35 min.), director: Julian Rosefeldt, production: Julian Rosefeldt Filmproduktion / Arndt + Partner
 La Mecanique (video-installation, 2003, 12 min.), directors: M+M, production: M+M
 Kunst-Stücke (2-channel-installation, 2001, 12 min.), director: Michael Muschner, production: Michael Muschner / Akademie der Künste Berlin

References 
  "Was soll Kunst?", CineArte review (German) about the shooting of Manifesto (Log-in necessary)
  "Christoph Krauss, BVK, on Shooting Manifesto", interview on the American Cinematographer website
  "I like doing art projects", interview in the context of the "100 years of Arri"-project

External links 
  Official website of Christoph Krauss
  Cameraguide of the German Society of Cinematographers (BVK)
  Profile on Crew-United
  Christoph Krauss at agency players
 

German cinematographers
1964 births
Living people
People from Hof, Bavaria
Mass media people from Bavaria